In group theory, a field of mathematics, a double coset is a collection of group elements which are equivalent under the symmetries coming from two subgroups. More precisely, let  be a group, and let  and  be subgroups.

Equivalently,  is the equivalence class of  under the equivalence relation
The set of all double cosets is denoted by

Properties 

Suppose that  is a group with subgroups  and  acting by left and right multiplication, respectively. Many of the basic properties of double cosets follow immediately from the fact that they are orbits.

  is the disjoint union of its double cosets.
 If , then .  If , then .

 The set of -double cosets is in bijection with the orbits , and also with the orbits  under the mappings  and  respectively.
It follows that . Similarly, if  is normal, then .
 Consider  as the union of a -orbit of right -cosets.
Therefore

The double stabilizer therefore has the descriptions

Then

There is an equivalent description of double cosets in terms of single cosets. Then  acts by left multiplication on the product of coset spaces . This correspondence identifies  with the double coset . Conceptually, this identifies the double coset space  with the space of relative configurations of an -coset and a -coset. Additionally, this construction generalizes to the case of any number of subgroups.

The analog of Lagrange's theorem for double cosets is false. If  denotes the identity permutation, then

It is also false that different double cosets have the same size. Continuing the same example,

which has two elements, not four.

However, suppose that  is normal.  As noted earlier, in this case the double coset space equals the left coset space .  Similarly, if  is normal, then  is the right coset space .  Standard results about left and right coset spaces then imply the following facts.

That is, all double cosets have the same cardinality.
 If  is finite, then .  In particular,  and  divide .

Examples 

 Let  be the symmetric group, considered as permutations of the set }. Consider the subgroup  which stabilizes . Then  consists of two double cosets.
 Let  be the group , and let  be the subgroup of upper triangular matrices. The double cosets are exactly , where  ranges over all n-by-n permutation matrices. For instance, if , then

Products in the free abelian group on the set of double cosets 

Under certain finiteness conditions, there is a product on the free abelian group generated by the - and -double cosets with values in the free abelian group generated by the -double cosets. This means there is a bilinear function

Assume for simplicity that  is finite. Every element of  has the form

This function may be pulled back along the projection  which sends  to the double coset . This results in a function . By the way in which this function was constructed, it is left invariant under  and right invariant under . The corresponding element of the group algebra  is

Conceptually, this element is obtained by replacing  by the elements it contains, and the finiteness of  ensures that the sum is still finite.

Indeed, it is trivial to check that the product of a left--invariant element and a right--invariant element continues to be left--invariant and right--invariant.

An important special case is when .  In this case, the product is a bilinear function

This product turns  into an associative ring whose identity element is the class of the trivial double coset .  In general, this ring is non-commutative.  For example, if , then the ring is the group algebra , and a group algebra is a commutative ring if and only if the underlying group is abelian.

If  is not normal, then  may be commutative even if  is non-abelian.  A classical example is the product of two Hecke operators.  This is the product in the Hecke algebra, which is commutative even though the group  is the modular group, which is non-abelian, and the subgroup is an arithmetic subgroup and in particular does not contain the commutator subgroup.  Commutativity of the convolution product is closely tied to Gelfand pairs.

When the group  is a topological group, it is possible to weaken the assumption that the number of left and right cosets in each double coset is finite. The product still corresponds to convolution. For instance, this happens for the Hecke algebra of a locally compact group.

Applications 

See 2-transitive groups for more information about this action.

The corresponding double coset structure carries information about how the resulting representation decomposes. In the case of finite groups, this is Mackey's decomposition theorem.

They are also important in functional analysis, where in some important cases functions left-invariant and right-invariant by a subgroup  can form a commutative ring under convolution: see Gelfand pair.

In number theory, the Hecke algebra corresponding to a congruence subgroup  of the modular group is spanned by elements of the double coset space ; the algebra structure is that acquired from the multiplication of double cosets described above.

References

Group theory